Vita-Mix Corporation, doing business as Vitamix, is an American company that manufactures blenders for consumers and the restaurant and hospitality industry. Vitamix has been operated by the Barnard family since 1921 and has been based in Olmsted Township, Ohio, since 1948. It employs more than 700 people, most at its Northeast Ohio headquarters and manufacturing facilities. Vitamix products are sold in over 130 countries.

History
Vitamix is privately owned and operated by the Barnard family. The company was founded in 1921 when William Grover Barnard began traveling the country selling modern kitchen products. It was by helping a friend through his illness that Barnard began to recognize the importance and impact that whole-food nutrition had on one's health and well-being. At that point, Barnard changed the name of the company to The Natural Food Institute.

In 1937 Barnard saw a blender at a trade show and introduced his own variations, creating a more durable and reliable series of blending machines. The name "Vita-Mix" emphasized "vita," meaning "life."

Vitamix was the first company to broadcast an infomercial for a specific manufactured product. In 1949, William's son, Bill Barnard, convinced his father to take his blender demonstrations to television. Television provided an opportunity for the company to reach thousands of individuals at a time with the company's message about whole-food nutrition and the power of blending fresh ingredients. The company’s TV marketing effort began with the purchase of time to demonstrate the product on WEWS-TV, a Cleveland, Ohio Television station.  The live demo went well, and Barnard hired Cinécraft Productions, a Cleveland sponsored film studio, to produce a series of filmed Vita-Mix demonstrations for WEWS and other television stations. Those early TV demonstrations are said to be the first TV infomercials. 

Bill Barnard inherited the business and in 1964 officially changed the name to Vita-Mix Corporation. The company's Vitamix 3600, the first blender that could make hot soup, blend ice cream, grind grain, and knead bread dough, was released in 1969.

In 1985, John Barnard and his brother created the Mix'n Machine, a high-performance commercial blender.

In February 2006, Blendtec sued Vitamix Corporation for infringing its patents on Blendtec's "Wild Side" jar design, which Vitamix had allegedly copied as its own MP and XP containers. The court concluded Vitamix had infringed Blendtec's patents, and awarded Blendtec total damages of approximately $24 million, the largest patent-related penalty in the history of Utah.

In 2009, Dr. Jodi Berg became the president of Vitamix, making her the fourth generation member of the Barnard family to hold the title. She became CEO in 2011. The distinguishing characteristic of Vitamix models is the two motors featuring 2 hp and 2.2 hp. The 2 hp motors were produced over many years since the introduction of the Vitamix 5000 model and the 2.2 hp motor was released in 2012.

21st century
The Vitamix product line, described as having a $400 starting price, has been covered by The New York Times.

Product recalls
Over 100,000 containers sold in 2017 and 2018 were recalled. One magazine headlined "Vitamix recall: Your $500 blender might hurt you."

Community Involvement
In 2019, Vitamix entered into a $200,000 partnership with Olmsted Falls City Schools, an Ohio "Triple A" public school district located in Olmsted Falls, Ohio, where the company is headquartered. The sponsorship deal includes naming rights to the district's high school football field, student curriculum enhancements, and food services support.

Early Vita-Mix TV Infomercials 

  Healthy Living Is Fun (1950) 5-minute, black and white filmed infomercial. Sponsor: Natural Foods Institute.  Features "Papa" Barnard, the founder of the Natural Foods Institute (later known as Vita-Mix)

  Health: Yours for the Asking (1950) 15-minute, black and white filmed infomercial. Sponsor: Natural Foods Institute.  Features "Papa" Barnard, the founder of the Natural Foods Institute (later known as Vita-Mix)

  Eat Your Way to Health (1950) 15-minute, black and white filmed infomercial. Sponsor: Natural Foods Institute. Features "Papa" Barnard, the founder of the Natural Foods Institute (later known as Vita-Mix)

  Wheel 'O Life (1950) 1-minute, black and white filmed commercial for Wheel 'O Life, a wheel chart listing various foods and their nutritional value and calories

References

External links
 

1921 establishments in Ohio
Kitchenware brands
American companies established in 1921
Manufacturing companies established in 1921
Manufacturing companies based in Ohio
Cuyahoga County, Ohio
American brands
Home appliance manufacturers of the United States
Privately held companies based in Ohio